Penicillium cainii is a fungus species of the genus of Penicillium which was isolated from soil in Korea.

See also
List of Penicillium species

References 

cainii
Fungi described in 2011